Sardor Jakhonov (Russian: Сардор Жахонов; born 28 June 1996) is an Uzbek professional footballer who plays as a midfielder. He can also slot in as an attacking midfielder or can also play as a defensive midfielder.

Club career

Earlier career
Jakhonov began his football career with Uzbekistan Super League side Quizilqum Zarafshon in 2019. After that stint, he joined the 2nd division side Oqtepa, but due to lack of game time there, he moved on to the Xorazm Urganch in 2021. He later moved to Kyrgyzstan and joined Premier League club FK Kaganat, where he made 12 appearances there scoring 2 goals.

Rajasthan United
On 1 February 2022, Jakhonov joined Rajasthan United in the final hours of deadline day as a free agent. He will be the AFC–quota Asian player at the club.

On 21 March 2022, he made his debut for the club against Churchill Brothers, in a 2–0 win. He scored his first goal for the club, on 29 March 2022, against Gokulam Kerala in a 1–1 draw, through the penalty spot.

Career statistics

Club

References

External links

Sardor Jakhonov at Sofascore

Uzbekistani footballers
Uzbekistani expatriate footballers
Expatriate footballers in India
I-League players
1996 births
Living people
Rajasthan United FC players
NEROCA FC players